Ramkrishnapur Union is a union parishad situated at Daulatpur Upazila,  in Kushtia District, Khulna Division of Bangladesh. There are 21 villages and 8 mouzas in the union.

References

External links
 

Unions of Khulna Division
Unions of Daulatpur Upazila, Kushtia
Unions of Kushtia District